Ragtime (I) is the second of three ballets made by New York City Ballet's co-founder and balletmaster George Balanchine to Igor Stravinsky's 1918 Ragtime for Eleven Instruments; with scenery by Robert Drew previously used for Lew Christensen's 1947 work for Ballet Society, Blackface; costumes by Karinska and lighting by David Hays. The premiere took place on December 7, 1960, at City Center of Music and Drama, conducted by Robert Irving, as part of a quartet of works titled Jazz Concert, together with dances by Todd Bolender's Creation of the World, Francisco Moncion's Les biches and John Taras' Ebony Concerto. Balanchine's 1966 Ragtime (II) was also made for City Ballet; his previous ballet to Stravinsky's Ragtime was one of a number of "informal little things" made in St. Petersburg in 1922.

Original cast 
Diana Adams
Bill Carter

Notes 

New York City Ballet repertory
Ballets by George Balanchine
Ballets to the music of Igor Stravinsky
Ballets designed by Barbara Karinska
Ballets designed by David Hays
Ballets designed by Robert Drew
1960 ballet premieres